id Tech is a series of separate game engines designed and developed by id Software. Prior to the presentation of the id Tech 5-based game Rage in 2011, the engines lacked official designation and as such were simply referred to as the Doom and Quake engines, from the name of the main game series the engines had been developed for. "id Tech" has been released as free software under the GNU General Public License. id Tech versions 0 to 3 were released under GPL-2.0-or-later. id Tech versions 3.5 to 4.5 were released under GPL-3.0-or-later. id Tech 5 to 7 are proprietary, with id Tech 7 currently being the latest utilized engine.

According to Eurogamer.net, "id Software has been synonymous with PC game engines since the concept of a detached game engine was first popularised." However id Tech 4 had far fewer licensees than the Unreal Engine from Epic Games, and id planned to regain the momentum with id Tech 5, until they were bought by ZeniMax Media which intended to keep the id Tech engines exclusively for id's sister studios.

Predecessors
id Software had developed 3D engines for several games before Wolfenstein 3D. Each engine had progressively more advanced 3D technology.
 Hovertank 3D (1991) used solid-color drawn polygonal walls and scalable sprites. The source code was released by Flat Rock Software in June 2014 under GPL-2.0-or-later.
 Catacomb 3-D (1991) added texture mapping to the walls. The source code was released by Flat Rock Software in June 2014 under GPL-2.0-or-later.

Wolfenstein 3D engine 

Wolfenstein 3D (1992) increased the color palette from 16-color EGA to 256-color VGA and also adopted raycasting. The game engine was also licensed out to other companies. The source code to Wolfenstein 3D, along with its prequel Spear of Destiny, was released on the 21st of July 1995 under a proprietary license, and then later under GPL-2.0-or-later.

ShadowCaster (1993) was built upon the Wolfenstein 3D engine and was licensed out to Raven Software. It features diminished lighting, texture mapped floors and ceilings, walls with variable heights, and sloped floors. This Raven engine was later also used by CyClones and In Pursuit of Greed.

Rise of the Triad uses an enhanced engine of Wolfenstein 3D and was meant to serve as the sequel to it. The source code was released on the 20th of December 2002 under GPL-2.0-or-later.

Other games using this engine are: Blake Stone: Aliens of Gold, Blake Stone: Planet Strike, Corridor 7: Alien Invasion, Operation Body Count, and Rise of the Triad.

id Tech 1

Originally known as the "Doom engine", this engine powers the id Software games Doom (1993) and Doom II: Hell on Earth (1994). It was created by John Carmack, with auxiliary functions written by John Romero, Dave Taylor, and Paul Radek. Initially developed on NeXT computers, it was ported to MS-DOS for Doom's release and was later ported to several game consoles and operating systems. The source code was released on the 23rd of December 1997 under a proprietary license, and then later on the 3rd of October 1999 under GPL-2.0-or-later.

Heretic and Hexen: Beyond Heretic were developed by Raven Software and published by id Software. Their sources were released on the 4th of September 2008 under GPL-2.0-only. Other games using this engine include Strife: Quest for the Sigil and Chex Quest.

id Tech 2

Originally known as "Quake engine", it was originally written to power 1996's Quake. It featured true 3D real-time rendering and is the first id Tech engine to use the client–server model. The source code was released on the 21st of December 1999 under GPL-2.0-or-later.

The Quake engine was updated with a new executable titled QuakeWorld that contained code to enhance the networking capabilities of Quake in response to the demand for across-internet network games that arose as a result of Quakes usage of UDP for networking.

id Tech 2 was later updated for the release of Quake II in 1997, with enhancements such as colored lighting and a new MD2 model format. id Tech 2.5 is the last to include a software renderer. The source code was released on the 22nd of December 2001 under GPL-2.0-or-later.

id Tech 3

Originally known as the "Quake III Arena engine", it was used to power id Software's Quake III Arena in 1999. The Quake III Arena engine was updated to patch 1.26 and later versions are called "Quake III Team Arena engine" with a new MD4 skeletal model format and huge outdoor areas. id Tech 3 is the first in this series to require an OpenGL-compliant graphics accelerator to run. The source code was released on the 19th of August 2005 under GPL-2.0-or-later.

id Tech 3 was updated with the 2001 release of Return To Castle Wolfenstein which included a single-player scripting system, and was eventually used to power the first Call of Duty title in 2003, ultimately spawning the IW engine. It was also used for Wolfenstein: Enemy Territory. The source code was released on the 12th of August 2010 under GPL-3.0-or-later.

id Tech 4

Commonly known as the "Doom 3 engine" which was used to power Doom 3 as it released in 2004, id Tech 4 began as an enhancement to id Tech 3. During development, it was initially just a complete rewrite of the engine's renderer, while still retaining other subsystems, such as file access, and memory management.  The decision to switch from C to the C++ programming language necessitated a restructuring and rewrite of the rest of the engine; today, while id Tech 4 contains code from id Tech 3, much of it has been rewritten. The source code was released on the 22nd of November 2011 under GPL-3.0-or-later.

Other games using this engine are: Raven Software's Quake 4 (2005) and Wolfenstein (2009), Human Head Studios' Prey (2006), Splash Damage's Enemy Territory: Quake Wars (2007) and Brink (2011).

id Tech 4 was updated with the 2012 release of Doom 3: BFG Edition with some features from id Tech 5. The source code was released on the 26th of November 2012 under GPL-3.0-or-later.

id Tech 5

Used for id Software's Rage, the engine is based on the file system frameworks. Some technologies included are the GUI system from id Tech 4, including a new renderer, MegaTexture 2.0 technology, soft shadows and more.
id is requiring companies that use the engine to publish their games through id's sister company, Bethesda Softworks.

The engine has since been used to power MachineGames' first two Wolfenstein titles; The New Order in 2014 with its standalone expansion The Old Blood, which released in 2015. It was also used for Tango Gameworks' The Evil Within (2014).

id Tech 6

Used for Doom released on May 13, 2016.  While the engine uses some of the features from id Tech 5, id has also added support for Vulkan rendering. Development of the renderer is led by Tiago Sousa, who had previously worked on CryEngine, following previous technical director John Carmack's resignation in 2013. id Tech 6 was also used in Wolfenstein II: The New Colossus (2017), and Wolfenstein: Youngblood (2019) again by MachineGames. It was not used for Quake Champions however, which combined id Tech features with the Saber3D Engine.

id Tech 7

At QuakeCon 2018, id Software announced the release of a new game in the Doom franchise called Doom Eternal. Powered by the id Tech 7 engine, Doom Eternal was released on March 20, 2020. The new engine is capable of delivering an increase in geometric detail without drops in frame-rate vs. id Tech 6. On PC, id Tech 7 supports Vulkan rendering only.

See also
 First-person shooter engine
 List of game engines

References

External links
Source code of open source engines released by id Software

 
Game engines for Linux
Video game engines